The 8th Kazakhstan President Cup was played from June 21 to June 27, 2015 in Astana. 8 youth teams participated in the tournament (players were born no earlier than 1999.)

Participants

Venues 
All games took place in  «Astana Arena».

Format 
The tournament is held in two stages. At the first stage, eight teams are divided into two qualification groups (A and B). Competitions of the first stage were held on circular system. The winners of the groups advance to the final, while the group runners-up meet to determine third place.

Squads

Group stage
All times UTC+6

Group A

Group B

Match for the 7th place

Match for the 5th place

Bronze medal match

Final

Statistics

Goalscorers 

4 goals

  Jordi Mboula

3 goals

  Kanstantsin Kazakou
  Beka Kavtaradze

2 goals

  Elchin Asadov
  Levan Khabaradze
  Levan Barabadze
  Madi Zhakipbayev
  Juan Cruz Aguero
  Paulino Migelez
  Victor San Bartolome
  Ramz Amrokhonov

1 goal

  Oksuz Dokugan
  Pilagha Mehdiyev
  Metin Guler
  Aliaksandar Ksenafontau
  Dzmitry Kalineika
  Nika Basaryia
  Akaki Kimeridze
  Nugzari Spanderashvili
  Giorgi Chakvetadze
  Vakhtang Koplatadze
  Lasha Ozbetelashvili
  Sagadat Tursynbay
  Mukhit Zhaksylyk
  Samat Bortay
  Erkhan Talasbayev
  Emir Shigaybayev
  Gulzhigit Borubayev
  Gulzhigit Alykulov
  Bogdan Petosh (1 pen.)
  Leonid Feoktistov
  Irakliy Tsaava
  Alejandro Millan
  Juan Brandariz
  Oriol Busquets
  Ivan Martin
  Francisco Garcia
  Manuel Morlanes
  Zievuddin Fuzaylov

Awards 
The best player of a tournament
Goalscorer of a tournament
 Jordi Mboula (4 goals)
The best goalkeeper of a tournament
The best defender of a tournament
 Huseyin Seyligli 
The best midfielder of a tournament
The best forward of a tournament
 Oksuz Dokugan 
Prize of spectator sympathies

Prize money 
According to FFK, the prize fund of a tournament will make 20,000 $. "The teams which took 1, 2 and 3 place will be received, respectively 10,000, 6,000 and 4,000 $.

References

External links 
España conquista la Copa Presidente do Kazajistán
España comienza la Copa Presidente con victoria ante Tayikistán (3-0)
La filosofia de juego te la Selección llega a Kazajistán
Azәrbaycan yigmasi "Prezident Kuboku"nda finala vәsiqә qazanib
Millinin futbolçularina Qazaxistanda mükafat verildi
საქართველოს 17-წლამდელთა ნაკრები ყაზახეთში პრეზიდენტის თასის გათამაშებაზე გაემგზავრა
Президент Кубогы:Қазақстан құрамасы Тәжікстан футболшыларын қапы қалдырды
Ҷоми президенти Қазоқистон: Ғалабаи бозигарони 16-солаи тоҷик ба ҳамсолонашон аз Қирғизистон

2015
2015 in Kazakhstani football
2015 in youth association football